Mardy Fish and Mark Knowles were the defending champions; however, they decided to retire their match against John Isner and Sam Querrey, when result of this match was 6–3, 5–7.Isner and Querrey won in the final 6–4, 6–4, against Ross Hutchins and Jordan Kerr.

Seeds

Draw

Draws

External links
Main Draw Doubles

2010 Regions Morgan Keegan Championships and the Cellular South Cup
Regions Morgan Keegan Championships - Doubles